Tylenol may refer to:

 Paracetamol (acetaminophen), a medication used to treat pain and fever
 Tylenol (brand), an American brand of drugs containing paracetamol